Carina Witthöft (also spelled Witthoeft, born 16 February 1995) is an inactive German professional tennis player. She has won one singles title on the WTA Tour whereas on the ITF Women's Circuit, she has won eleven singles titles and one doubles title. On 8 January 2018, she reached her career-high singles ranking of world No. 48.

Career
Witthöft made her WTA Tour debut at the 2012 Swedish Open. Having defeated Marina Shamayko, Akgul Amanmuradova and Jill Craybas to qualify, she lost in the first round of the main draw against Kateryna Bondarenko.

She won her maiden WTA title at the 2017 Luxembourg Open, defeating Monica Puig in straight sets in the final.

She was coached by Torben Beltz and then by Philip Lang.

2018
Witthöft started the season at the Brisbane International where she lost in the first round to Aleksandra Krunić. Despite being defeated in the final round of qualifying at the Sydney International by Camila Giorgi, Witthöft entered the main draw as a lucky loser. She lost in the first round to Australian wildcard Sam Stosur. At the Australian Open, Witthöft was defeated in the first round by eighth seed Caroline Garcia.

In Doha at the Qatar Open, she lost in the second round to top seed Caroline Wozniacki.

2019
Witthöft played her last professional match to date at the Australian Open qualifying, where she lost in the first round.

Singles performance timeline

Current through the 2019 WTA Tour.

WTA career finals

Singles: 1 (1 title)

ITF finals

Singles: 20 (11 titles, 9 runner–ups)

Doubles: 1 (1 title)

Head-to-head records

Record against top 10 players

  Julia Görges 2–0
  CoCo Vandeweghe 2–0
  Kiki Bertens 2–2
  Belinda Bencic 1–0
  Ons Jabeur 1–0
  Jeļena Ostapenko 1–0
  Aryna Sabalenka 1–0
  Francesca Schiavone 1–0
  Nicole Vaidišová 1–0
  Kimiko Date 1–1
  Carla Suárez Navarro 1–1
  Timea Bacsinszky 0–1
  Eugenie Bouchard 0–1
  Dominika Cibulková 0–1
  Sara Errani 0–1
  Ana Ivanovic 0–1
  Jelena Janković 0–1
  Barbora Krejčíková 0–1
  Andrea Petkovic 0–1
  Karolína Plíšková 0–1
  Agnieszka Radwańska 0–1
  Lucie Šafářová 0–1
  Sloane Stephens 0–1
  Samantha Stosur 0–1
  Elina Svitolina 0–1
  Roberta Vinci 0–1
  Serena Williams 0–1
  Svetlana Kuznetsova 0–2
  Garbiñe Muguruza 0–2
  Caroline Wozniacki 0–2
  Caroline Garcia 0–3
  Angelique Kerber 0–3
  Anett Kontaveit 0–3

*

References

External links

 
 
 
 

1995 births
Living people
People from Herzogtum Lauenburg
German female tennis players
Sportspeople from Schleswig-Holstein